Augustana may refer to:

In religion:
 The Augustana or Augsburg Confession, which gives its name to several Lutheran institutions
 Augustana Evangelical Lutheran Church, a Lutheran religious body from the 1860 until 1962
 Augustana Lutheran Church (Sioux City, Iowa), listed on the National Register of Historic Places as the Swedish Evangelical Lutheran Augustana Church

In education:
 Augustana Academy, a former educational institute in South Dakota
 Augustana College (Illinois), a liberal arts college in Illinois
 Augustana University (South Dakota), a liberal arts college in South Dakota
 Augustana University College, a formerly Lutheran college in Alberta
 The University of Alberta Augustana Faculty of the University of Alberta, the present incarnation of the former Augustana University College after its merger with the University of Alberta
 Augustana Divinity School (Neuendettelsau), a divinity school of the Evangelical Lutheran Church in Bavaria in Neuendettelsau, Germany

In music:
 Augustana (band), a rock band from California
 Augustana (album), the rock band's third, self-titled album